The Golden Virgins were an English four-piece pop and rock group from Sunderland, Tyne and Wear, England.

The members of the band were Lucas Renney (singer/guitarist), Neil Bassett (drums), Dave Younger (synth/keyboards) and Allan Burnup (bass).  The band had shown great significance in Sunderland local music industry as they had played at Glastonbury, T in the Park, Leeds and Reading, dubbing them as one of Sunderland best known bands. The band split up in late 2006. Though, as of April 2016, they reunited as a band.

The band released five singles and an album. Its album, Songs of Praise, received critical accolades, having been released through XL Recordings in 2004. The Golden Virgins track "Renaissance Kid" was voted No. 42 in the 2003 Festive Fifty.

References

External links
The Golden Virgins, Official Site

English rock music groups
English pop music groups
Musical groups from Sunderland